Travis Bradford is a Professor of Professional Practice at Columbia University.  He teaches at the Columbia Business School, the Earth Institute and the School of International and Public Affairs within the fields of energy and natural resource markets and innovation. 

Bradford is also the president at the Prometheus Institute for Sustainable Development. Through his work at the Prometheus Institute, he was part of launching Greentech Media and the Carbon War Room.

Prior to teaching at Columbia University, he taught at the University of Chicago and Duke University.

Education
He earned a B.A. in finance from Georgia State University, an MBA from New York University Stern School of Business and an MPP from the Harvard Kennedy School.

Books
The Energy System: Technology, Economics, Markets, and Policy, MIT Press, 2017, .
Solar Revolution: The Economic Transformation of the Global Energy Industry, MIT Press, 2006, .

References 

Year of birth missing (living people)
Living people
Columbia University faculty
Harvard Kennedy School alumni
New York University Stern School of Business alumni
Georgia State University alumni
University of Chicago faculty
Duke University faculty